An Apocrine nevus is an extremely rare cutaneous condition that is composed of hyperplastic mature apocrine glands.

See also 
 Eccrine nevus
 Seborrheic keratosis
 List of cutaneous conditions

References

External links 

Epidermal nevi, neoplasms, and cysts
Apocrine